Vasil is a 2022 Spanish-Bulgarian comedy-drama film written and directed by Avelina Prat in her directorial feature debut, which stars Ivan Barnev (as the title character), Karra Elejalde, and Alexandra Jiménez alongside Susi Sánchez, and Sue Flack.

Plot 
The plot follows the relation of friendship developed between Vasil (an intelligent and charismatic Bulgarian immigrant, as well as skilled player of bridge and chess) and Alfredo, a retired and widowed gruffy architect who welcomes the former into his house, amazement of Luisa (Alfredo's daughter as well as translator and bibliophile) notwithstanding.

Cast

Production 
Santiago Racaj worked as cinematographer whereas Mónica Bernuy took over art direction.

Release 
Vasil had its world premiere at the Warsaw Film Festival. Its festival run also included the Valladolid International Film Festival (Seminci) and the Mostra de Valencia. Originally included in the Seminci's 'Meeting Point' slate, the film was included in the festival's official selection instead upon the disqualification of Jaime Chávarri's La manzana de oro. Distributed by Filmax, it was theatrically released in Spain on 4 November 2022.

Reception 
Carlos Marañón of Cinemanía rated the "spoken and delayed film featuring an original rhythm of its own" with 3 out of 5 stars, considering that even if the profusion of certain situations can become somewhat repetitive, the pause and the acting work "leave a strange but addictive peace, very uncommon in recent cinema".

Elsa Fernández-Santos of El País deemed Prat's debut feature to be a "kind story of friendship", otherwise featuring elements of costumbrista comedy and autobiographical tones.

Mariana Hristova of Cineuropa highlighted Elejalde and Barnev for their "organic performance of the graceful nuances in the communication between two people who represent opposing universes", while adding that the indoor settings and warm tones manage to create an "intimate atmosphere".

Accolades 

|-
| rowspan = "10" align = "center" | 2022 || 67th Valladolid International Film Festival || Best Actor || Karra Elejalde & Ivan Barnev ||  || 
|-
| rowspan = "8" | 5th Berlanga Awards || colspan = "2" | Best Film ||  || rowspan = "8" | 
|-
| Best Director || Avelina Prat || 
|-
| Best Screenplay || Avelina Prat || 
|-
| Best Original Score || Vincent Barrière || 
|-
| Best Sound || Iván Martínez Rufat || 
|-
| Best Production Supervision ||  Lorena Lluch || 
|-
| Best Supporting Actress || Susi Sánchez || 
|-
| Best Costume Design || Giovanna Ribes || 
|-
| 15th Gaudí Awards || Best New Director || Avelina Prat ||  || 
|-
| rowspan = "2" align = "center" | 2023 || rowspan = "2" | 10th Feroz Awards || colspan = "2" | Best Comedy Film ||  || rowspan = "2" | 
|-
| Best Actor in a Film || Karra Elejalde || 
|}

See also 
 List of Spanish films of 2022

References 

2020s Spanish films
Bulgarian comedy-drama films
Spanish comedy-drama films
2022 comedy-drama films
2020s Spanish-language films
Films shot in the province of Valencia
Films shot in Valencia
2022 directorial debut films